Beverly Grigsby née Pinsky (born 11 January 1928) is an American composer, musicologist and electronic/computer music pioneer.

Early life
Beverly Pinsky was born in Chicago, Illinois, and studied music as a child. She moved to California with her family at the age of 13 and graduated from Fairfax High School.

Education
She entered the University of Southern California to study pre-med, and also studied composition with Ernst Krenek at the Southern California School of Music and the Arts. She graduated with Bachelor of Arts and Master of Arts degrees in composition from California State University, Northridge, and a Doctorate of Musical Arts in composition from the University of Southern California. She later studied computer music generation at Stanford University’s Center for Artificial Intelligence and at M.I.T. in 1975-1976.

Career
After completing her studies, Grigsby took a position teaching music at California State University, Northridge, and also established and directed the Computer Music Studio there. In 1984 Grigsby composed the first computerized score for an opera. Along with Jeannie G. Pool, she founded the International Institute for the Study of Women in Music in 1985. She retired from her teaching position in 1993, but continued to teach privately and work as a composer. Her music has been performed internationally.

Honors and awards
The National Endowment for the Arts award
The Arts International (Rockefeller) Grant
CSUN Distinguished Professor Award
CSU Chancellor’s Maxi Grant
IAWM Outstanding Music Contribution Award
Annual ASCAP awards
Carnegie Mellon Fellow in Technology (1987)
Getty Museum Research Scholar (1997–98)

Works
Grigsby has composed choral and chamber music, and also for film soundtracks and stage. She is noted for electroacoustic compositions.  Selected works include:

The Mask of Eleanor (1984) chamber opera with computer score
Vision of St. Joan for soprano and computer (1987)
Shakti II (1985) for soprano
Trio for Violin, B-flat Clarinet and Piano (1994)
Movements for Guitar (1982)
Five Studies for Two Untransposed Hexachords for piano (1971)
Spheres (1998) for Fairlight III Computer Music Instrument

References

External links
Interview with Beverly Grigsby - NAMM Oral History Library (2010)

1928 births
Living people
20th-century classical composers
American music educators
American women music educators
American women classical composers
American classical composers
Musicians from Chicago
University of Southern California alumni
California State University, Northridge alumni
Stanford University alumni
Massachusetts Institute of Technology alumni
California State University, Northridge faculty
American women in electronic music
20th-century American women musicians
20th-century American composers
Classical musicians from Illinois
20th-century women composers
21st-century American women